Germiston Callies was a South African football (soccer) club based in Germiston.

Origins

Founded by Scottish immigrants (mainly railway men and miners) in 1906. The club's original full name was Germiston Caledonian Society Amateur Football Club, the name was changed when the club turned professional in 1959.

Leagues
Callies originally played in the amateur Transvaal League and were quite successful. One of their outstanding players during this period was Berry Nieuwenhuys, who later captained Liverpool in the English First Division. Callies won the Transvaal league at least 6 times and the challenge cup 9 times.

NFL

The club joined the professional NFL on its inception in 1959 (and indeed stayed in that league until its demise in 1977). Although Germiston Callies FC reached the Castle Cup final in 1959, they never really fulfilled expectations. They came third in the league two years running, in 1960 and 1961,and in 1962 won the UTC Bowl but that's as good as it got. Their reliance on local talent was a source of pride, but made it increasingly difficult to compete during the 1960s as the top clubs of the NFL filled their ranks with seasoned professionals from overseas.  The Callies usually stayed comfortably clear of relegation, though, until the final NFL season in 1977, when they finished last of the 13 teams.

NPSL
When the NFL folded, the club joined the NPSL for a single season, playing under the name Imperial Callies.

Honours

 1962 – UTC Bowl Winners

Managers
 Donald Burne (1959–1964)
 Alfie Boyd (1965–1967)
 Mickey Lill (1968–1973, 1977–1979)
 Mike Kenning (1974–1976)
 Willie Havenga (1978)

See also
 National Football League (South Africa)

References

External links
 http://expro.co.za
 http://www.vb-tech.co.za/nflsoccer/club.php?id=germiston
 http://www.amethyst.co.za/Germiston/index

 
Defunct soccer clubs in South Africa
National Football League (South Africa) clubs
Soccer clubs in Pretoria
1906 establishments in South Africa
1906 in South African sport
Association football clubs established in 1906
Association football clubs disestablished in 1978
Sport in Germiston
1978 disestablishments in South Africa